The 1951 Cincinnati Bearcats football team was an American football team that represented the University of Cincinnati as a member of the Mid-American Conference (MAC) during the 1951 college football season. The Bearcats were led by head coach Sid Gillman and compiled a 10–1 record and were named MAC Champions.

Schedule

References

Cincinnati
Cincinnati Bearcats football seasons
Mid-American Conference football champion seasons
Cincinnati Bearcats football